Padjadjaran University (abbreviated as UNPAD) is a public university located in Sumedang Regency and Bandung, which is the provincial capital of West Java, Indonesia. It was established on September 11, 1957.

UNPAD has gained the most applicant and highest passing grade in National Selection of State University Entrance (SNMPTN) since 2013. In 2014, UNPAD was officially set as State University of Legal Entities and accredited "A" by BAN-PT. It also ranked as top ten universities in Indonesia by Ministry of Research, Technology and Higher Education in 2016. In the 2019 QS World Universities Ranking, UNPAD is ranked 4th in Indonesia and got in the range of rankings of 651-700th in the world.

UNPAD was also one of the contributors to the venue for an important conference, the Asia-Africa Conference in 1955, where Bandung was appointed as the host. Therefore, the construction of its facilities is prevalent since then.

History

The name "Padjadjaran" (in Republican Spelling System) was taken from the Sunda Kingdom city of Pakuan Pajajaran. The background of establishment began from the willingness of community leaders to improve youth education to higher degree in West Java at the time. Since Bandung Institute of Technology had more focus on engineering science, people were keen to have other state university which provides education in various field of science. The university was officially opened by the President of Republic Indonesia, Sukarno, on September 24, 1957. On November 6, 1957, Prof. Iwa Koesoemasoemantri was appointed the President of Padjadjaran University.

When established, the university had four departments: Law, Economics, Medicine, and Mathematics and Natural Sciences. Now it has developed into 16 faculties and several postgraduate programs, 44 undergraduate programs (Strata 1/S1), two specialist programs, nine doctorate programs (Strata 3/S3), 19 master's degree programs (Strata 2/S2), five profession programs, one four-year diploma program (D4), and 32 three-year diploma programs (D3).

Initially established in Bandung, all undergraduate departments have been relocated to Jatinangor, a town near Sumedang. The concept was inspired by "Tsukuba Science City". The university started to move gradually, starting from the Faculty of Agriculture in 1983 and followed by the others. The rectorate building in Jatinangor was officially inaugurated on 5 January 2012.

Rector 
The list of UNPAD Rector since its beginning until now as follows:

Prof. Iwa Koesoemasoemantri (1957–1961)
 Prof. Soeria Soemantri (1961–1964)
 Moh Sanusi Hardjadinata (1964–1966)
 Prof. RS Soeria Atmadja (1966–1973)
 Prof. Dr. Mochtar Kusumaatmadja (1973–1974)
 Prof. Hindersah Wiraatmadja (1974–1982)
 Prof. Dr. Yuyun Wirasasmita (1982–1990)
 Prof. Dr. H. Maman P. Rukmana (1990–1998)
 Prof. Dr. HA Himendra Wargahadibrata (1998–2007)
 Prof. Dr. Ir. Ganjar Kurnia, DEA (2007–2015)
 Prof. Dr. med. Tri Hanggono Achmad, dr. (2015–2019)
 Prof. Dr. Rina Indiastuti, S.E., M.SIE., (2019–present)

Campuses
UNPAD has two main campuses. One of the main campus located in Jatinangor, the other is Dipati Ukur campus, located in Bandung. Besides those two locations, there are several campuses spread over in Bandung including Sekeloa, Singaperbangsa, Dago 4, Simpang Dago, Dago Atas, Dago Pojok, Banda, Cimadiri, Cisangkuy, Eyckman, Pasirkaliki, Teuku Umar, and some other locations.

In September 2011, the university announced its intention to build a shopping center and a three storey hotel in Jl. Dago with the profits used to finance the university.

Dipati Ukur Campus 
Unpad Dipati Ukur campus located in Jl. Dipati Ukur No.35, Bandung, that currently dedicated mostly for postgraduate programs. This campus was previously used for campus activities by Faculty of Economics and Business (Bachelor and Diploma) and Faculty of Law. However, starting from mid-2017, the two faculties followed the other faculties to move to the Jatinangor Sumedang campus.

Now this campus is used for campus activities of the Faculty of Economics and Business (Master and Doctoral) and it is used for other activities such as graduation, inauguration of professors and professional oaths.

Jatinangor Campus 
Unpad Jatinangor campus located in Jatinangor, Sumedang, West Java. This campus is the main campus which consists of Faculty of Medicine, Faculty of Dentistry, Faculty of Psychology, Faculty of Nursing, Faculty of Mathematics and Natural Sciences, Faculty of Animal Husbandry, Faculty of Agriculture Industrial Technology, Faculty of Agriculture, Faculty of Fishery and Marine Science, Faculty of Pharmacy, Faculty of Geological Engineering, Faculty of Communication Science, Faculty of Cultural Science, Faculty of Social and Political Sciences, Faculty of Law, and Faculty of Economics and Business.

Currently at the Jatinangor Campus, the Central Library / CISRAL building, the Central Laboratory, and 15 other new buildings have been completed at the end of 2016.

Facilities

Accommodation 

There are several dormitories:
 Asrama Padjadjaran I - allocated for students funded by Bidik Misi scholarship
 Asrama Padjadjaran II - allocated for students funded by Bidik Misi scholarship
 Asrama Padjadjaran III - allocated for pharmacy students
 Asrama Pedca
 Bale Padjadjaran - allocated for first-year medicine students
 Bale Santika - Auditorium
All of student dormitories are located in Jatinangor, Sumedang.

Transportation 

The university has some free campus transportation operated from Monday until Friday, from 7 a.m. to 5 p.m. in Jatinangor campus.

Library 

As one of the most important facility, UNPAD has a central library located in front of Dipati Ukur campus, named UPT Perpustakaan Universitas Padjadjaran. Later on, it moved to Jatinangor campus. Moreover, each of faculties in the university has at least one library in their buildings.

Health Center 

UNPAD has two health center located in Dipati Ukur, named Bale Kesehatan, and in Jatinangor, named Klinik Padjadjaran. Not only for students, Klinik Padjadjaran also provides health service for the public.

Sports 

There are two sport facilities: Stadion Jati Padjadjaran (outdoor) and Bale Santika (indoor). Both are located in Jatinangor campus.

Meeting Room 

The university has numerous meeting rooms located in Dipati Ukur campus (including Bale Rumawat, Ruang Serba Guna 2 and Graha Sanusi Hardjadinata) and Jatinangor campus (including Bale Sawala, Bale Rucita and Bale Santika). The graduation ceremony is regularly held in Graha Sanusi Hardjadinata. Moreover, the building is also open for public reservation.

Other Facilities 

Several students from non-social science faculty shall visit Center for Basic Science Program, known as PTBS or PPBS, in their first year. Within this period, they will learn basic science: biology, chemistry, physics and calculus. There is also Center for Language Program developed by Faculty of Literature.

In 2013, UNPAD built a mosque in Jatinangor campus named Masjid Raya UNPAD (MRU), also known as Bale Aweuhan. There is also a mosque in Dipati Ukur campus.

The university also built a central laboratory in 2016 to advance multi discipline research, especially in Herbal Science. The building is located in Jatinangor campus.

Faculties and Programs

Faculty of Medicine

Tutorial buildings

The faculty has five main buildings at the Jatinangor campus:
 A1: Administration.
 A2: Tutorial rooms, staff rooms, laboratories for physiology, pharmacology, biochemistry.
 A3: Interactive tutorial rooms (capacity of 300 persons), digital information system library and one computer laboratory.
 A4: Staff rooms and laboratories of anatomy, parasitology, microbiology, biology cell and 30 computerized tutorial rooms connected with intra internet, library and supporting facilities for discussion.
 A5: For general lectures, 30 clinical skill laboratories, 30 tutorial rooms, one computer laboratory for computer access and application of computerized statistics which is free to access by students and staffs

Library
The faculty has the main library at Jatinangor campus and libraries at each department of the faculty as well as the library at Hasan Sadikin Hospital.

The main library in A3 has 31000 holdings (textbooks, national and international journals, newsletter, magazine, dissertation/thesis/final papers). Besides those, the library has electronics journals which provides 300 titles.

The library has air-conditioned rooms, reading rooms (100 users capacity), computer facilities connected to the internet to access electronic journal (e-library).

Laboratory
The faculty has four laboratories:
 Clinical skill laboratory
 Biomedical laboratory
 Computer laboratory
 Learning evaluation laboratory

Faculty of Mathematics and Natural Sciences
The faculty has several study programs, including doctorate degree, master's degree and bachelor's degree. Most of its buildings are located in Jatinangor campus. The faculty has 21 laboratories, used to facilitate both academic and research activities, and a library. Each year, students of this faculty have significant participation in National Mathematics and Natural Sciences Olympics and Program Kreativitas Mahasiswa, organized by Ministry of Research, Technology and Higher Education.

Study programs

References

Educational institutions established in 1957
Universities in Bandung
Universities in West Java
Academic staff of Padjadjaran University
Indonesian state universities
1957 establishments in Indonesia